The 1972–73 Montreal Canadiens season, the club's 64th season, led to the Canadiens winning their 18th Stanley Cup in club history.

Regular season
Rookie goalie Wayne Thomas left his mark in Canadiens history by becoming only the second goaltender in over 50 seasons to record a shutout (3–0) in his NHL debut against Vancouver on January 14, 1973.

Final standings

Schedule and results

Playoffs
The Canadiens met the Buffalo Sabres making their playoff debut in the first round, defeating the Sabres four games to two. In the second round, the Canadiens defeated the Philadelphia Flyers who had beaten the Minnesota North Stars, winning the series four games to one to advance to the finals against the Chicago Black Hawks.

Finals

Chicago Black Hawks vs. Montreal Canadiens

Montreal wins the series 4–2.

Player statistics

Regular season
Scoring

Goaltending

Playoffs
Scoring

Goaltending

Awards and records
 Prince of Wales Trophy.
 Guy Lapointe, runner up, Norris Trophy.
 Yvan Cournoyer won the Conn Smythe Trophy as playoff MVP.

Transactions

Draft picks
Montreal's draft picks at the 1972 NHL Amateur Draft held at the Queen Elizabeth Hotel in Montreal, Quebec.

See also
 1972–73 NHL season
 List of Stanley Cup champions

References
 Canadiens on Hockey Database
 Canadiens on NHL Reference

Stanley Cup championship seasons
Montreal Canadiens seasons
Mon
Mon
Montreal Canadiens
Montreal Canadiens